The 1954 Tour de Romandie was the eighth edition of the Tour de Romandie cycle race and was held from 13 May to 16 May 1954. The race started and finished in Le Locle. The race was won by Jean Forestier.

General classification

References

1954
Tour de Romandie